Christel Truglia (born February 16, 1936) is a former member of Connecticut's 145th assembly district, and a member of the Democratic political party.

Early life
Christel Truglia was born in Schotmarr [recte Schötmar], Germany, a quarter of Bad Salzuflen in present-day North Rhine-Westphalia, during the years before World War II. Her mother was an American who traveled to Germany and later married a German headwaiter, Christel's father. They married and had five children, Christel, her three sisters, and one brother. When Christel was three, Germany invaded Poland, sparking World War II in Europe. Years later, when other countries began bombing Europe, one was dropped on the house next door to Christel's home. It did not go off, but her family had to move into a smaller home. At the age of eight, her father died, and three years later, Christel and her family traveled from Germany to Darien, Connecticut where Christel attended Darien public schools. She received a high school diploma, but did not take her education further.

Personal life
Christel worked for an insurance company after graduating from high school, she also joined a choir at a local church. During her time with this church, she met and subsequently married the church's organist, Anthony Truglia. Christel and Anthony had three children, Sallyanne, Anthony Jr., and Penny.

Political career
Truglia was elected into office as a state representative in 1988, where she remained undefeated during elections for the two decades during which she held office. As a state representative, Christel was appointed to be the assistant Majority Leader. Truglia was also places on several legislative committees such as the Appropriations Committee, Human Services Committee, and the Select Committee on Children.

Community service
Truglia's work centered heavily, but did not exclusively include, children. In 1996, Christel founded the Truglia Thumbelina Fund in efforts of helping children in Stamford. She also established a toy closet in 2005 called "David's Treasure Tree Toy Closet" (in memory of a boy named David who died of leukemia at a young age) for children who visit Stamford Hospital in Stamford, Connecticut.

References

1936 births
Living people
Democratic Party members of the Connecticut House of Representatives
Emigrants from Nazi Germany to the United States
German people of American descent
People from Bad Salzuflen
Politicians from North Rhine-Westphalia
Women state legislators in Connecticut